Kevin Alejandro Vicuña (born January 14, 1998) is a Venezuelan professional baseball shortstop in the Arizona Diamondbacks organization.

Career

Toronto Blue Jays
Vicuña signed as an international free agent with the Toronto Blue Jays on July 2, 2014. He made his professional baseball debut in the Dominican Summer League in 2015, and batted .268 with 20 runs batted in (RBI) and 10 stolen bases in 62 games for the Dominican Summer League Blue Jays as a 17-year-old. He spent the 2016 season in Rookie ball, hitting .258 with 14 RBI and 11 stolen bases in 48 games for the Gulf Coast League Blue Jays.

In 2017, Vicuña played for all three of the Blue Jays Class-A affiliates: the Vancouver Canadians, Lansing Lugnuts, and Dunedin Blue Jays. He hit a combined .269 with 25 RBI and 17 stolen bases in 84 games across all levels. Vicuña played all of 2018 for the Lansing Lugnuts, where he hit .266 with two home runs, 37 RBI, and 10 stolen bases in a career-high 89 games. His impressive play started to gather the attention of those in the organization, and he was named the "Sleeper" of the Blue Jays minor league system by Baseball America for 2018. During the 2018 offseason, Vicuña played in 19 games for the Tigres de Aragua of the Venezuelan Winter League. He started the 2019 season in Advanced-A for Dunedin, and hit .253 in 115 games for the year which included a short stint in Triple-A Buffalo. Vicuña did not play in a game in 2020 due to the cancellation of the minor league season because of the COVID-19 pandemic. Vicuña spent the majority of the 2021 season with the Double-A New Hampshire Fisher Cats, also playing 6 games for Triple-A Buffalo. On the year, Vicuña slashed .245/.305/.314 with 2 home runs and 38 RBI in 82 total games. He became a free agent on November 7, 2021.

Philadelphia Phillies
On January 4, 2022, Vicuña signed a minor league contract with the Philadelphia Phillies. Vicuña played in 88 games for the Double-A Reading Fightin Phils, slashing .272/.326/.372 with 2 home runs, 37 RBI, and 9 stolen bases. He elected free agency following the season on November 10.

Arizona Diamondbacks
On February 3, 2023, Vicuña signed a minor league contract with the Arizona Diamondbacks organization.

References

External links

Living people
1998 births
Baseball shortstops
Dominican Summer League Blue Jays players
Minor league baseball players
Dunedin Blue Jays players
Vancouver Canadians players
Lansing Lugnuts players
Tigres de Aragua players
Buffalo Bisons (minor league) players
New Hampshire Fisher Cats players
Venezuelan baseball players
People from Puerto la Cruz